The South American Swimming Championships are a biennial aquatics championships (held in even years) for countries from CONSANAT (the South American Swimming Confederation). These championships include competition in Swimming, Diving, Synchronized swimming, Water polo, and Open water swimming.

Countries
CONSANAT member countries participate in these Championships:

Championships 
2006 Open water swimming in Cartagena and 2010 in South American Games.

Championships records
All records were set in finals unless noted otherwise. All times are swum in a long-course (50m) pool.

Men

Women

Mixed relay

See also 
 South American Aquatics Championships 
 South American Masters Aquatics Championships
 South American Juniors Aquatics Championships
 Central American and Caribbean Swimming Championships
 Caribbean Islands Swimming Championships
 UANA Water Polo Cup
 :es:Campeonato Sudamericano de Waterpolo
 :sk:Majstrovstvá Južnej Ameriky vo vodnom póle
 South American Games

References

External links
 South American Swimming Championships Records - Men
 South American Swimming Championships Records - Women

 
C
International swimming competitions
S